The 2002–03 Serie B was the 71st season since its establishment in 1929. It is the second highest football league in Italy.

Teams
Livorno, Ascoli, Triestina and Catania had been promoted from Serie C, while Hellas Verona, Lecce, and Venezia had been relegated from Serie A and Fiorentina had lost their national professional licence.

Final classification 
In June 2003, Catania was at the centre of a controversy that led to the enlargement of Serie B from 20 to 24 teams, known as Caso Catania. The club claimed that Siena fielded an ineligible player in a 1–1 tie, a result which saw Catania relegated, whereas the two extra points from a victory would have kept them safe. They were awarded a 2–0 victory before the result was reverted because the guilty player was a substitute which did not play the match, then Catania appealed to the judges of the Autonomous Region of Sicily who re-awarded the victory again. In August, the FIGC decided to let Catania, along with Genoa and Salernitana, stay in Serie B; the newly reborn Fiorentina were also added for the 2003–04 season. The ruling led to protests and boycotts by the other Serie B clubs that delayed the start of the season, until the intervention of the Italian government.

Results 

Serie B seasons
2002–03 in Italian football leagues
Italy